The American Political Science Association (APSA) is a professional association of political science students and scholars in the United States. Founded in 1903 in the Tilton Memorial Library (now Tilton Hall) of Tulane University in New Orleans, it publishes four academic journals: American Political Science Review, Perspectives on Politics, Journal of Political Science Education, and PS: Political Science & Politics. APSA Organized Sections publish or are associated with 15 additional journals.

APSA presidents serve one-year terms. The current president is John Ishiyama of the University of North Texas. Woodrow Wilson, who later became President of the United States, was APSA president in 1909. APSA's headquarters are at 1527 New Hampshire Avenue NW in Washington, D.C., in a historic building that was owned by Admiral George Remy, labor leader Samuel Gompers, the American War Mothers, and Harry Garfield, son of President James A. Garfield and president of the association from 1921 to 1922.

APSA administers the Centennial Center for Political Science and Public Affairs, which offers fellowships, conference, research space and grants for scholars, and administers Pi Sigma Alpha, the honor society for political science students. It also periodically sponsors seminars and other events for political scientists, policymakers, the media, and the general public.

Conferences and meetings 
The association broadly aims to encourage scholarly understanding of political ideas, norms, behaviors, and institutions, and to inform public choices about government, governance, and public policy. APSA's mission is to "support excellence in scholarship and teaching and informed discourse about politics, policy and civic participation." APSA conducts several annual conferences, which provide an environment for scholars and other professionals to network and present their work, along with other pertinent and useful resources. The APSA Annual Meeting is among the world's largest gatherings of political scientists. It occurs on Labor Day weekend each summer.

The  APSA Teaching and Learning Conference is a smaller working group conference hosting cutting-edge approaches, techniques, and methodologies for the political science classroom. The conference provides a forum for scholars to share effective and innovative teaching and learning models and to discuss broad themes and values of political science education—especially the scholarship of teaching and learning.

With funding from the Andrew W. Mellon Foundation, APSA has organized political science workshops in various locations in Africa, APSA Africa Workshops. The first workshop was convened in Dakar, Senegal in partnership with the West African Research Center from July 6–27, 2008. The annual residential workshops are led by a joint U.S. and African organizing team and aimed at mid-and junior-level scholars residing in Africa. They will enhance the capacities of political scientists and their resources in East and West Africa while also providing a forum for supporting their ongoing research. Each three week workshop brings together up to 30 scholars and cover substantive issues, methodologies, and reviews of research. See also, APSA International Programs.

Awards 
To recognize excellence in the profession, the Association offers the following awards:
 Dissertation Awards
 Paper and Article Awards
 Book Awards
 Career Awards
 Goodnow Award
 Teaching Award and Campus Teaching Award Recognition

In addition to the APSA awards, the APSA organized sections also present over 100 awards at every Annual Meeting to recognize important research and contributions to the profession. These awards are presented at the Association's Annual Meeting.

Centennial Center for Political Science and Public Affairs 
Through its facilities and endowed funding programs, APSA'S Centennial Center for Political Science and Public Affairs supports political science teaching, research, and public engagement. Opened in 2003, the centenary of APSA's establishment, the Centennial Center encourages individual research and writing in all fields of political science, facilitates collaboration among scholars working within the discipline and across the social and behavioral sciences and humanities, and promotes communication between scholars and the public.

The Centennial Center, its facilities, and research support programs continue to be made possible in part through the generous donations of APSA members. The Centennial Center for Political Science and Public Affairs assists APSA members with the costs of research, including travel, interviews, access to archives, or costs for a research assistant. Funds can also be used to assist scholars in publishing their research. Grants can range in size from $500 to $10,000, depending upon the research fund.

Congressional Fellowship Program 
The APSA Congressional Fellowship Program is a highly selective, nonpartisan program devoted to expanding knowledge and awareness of Congress. Since 1953, it has brought select political scientists, journalists, federal employees, health specialists, and other professionals to Capitol Hill to experience Congress at work through fellowship placements on congressional staffs.

The nine-month program begins each November with an intensive one-month introduction to Congress taught by leading experts in the field. After orientation, fellows work in placements of their choosing and also participate in ongoing seminars and enrichment programs.

Through this unique opportunity, the American Political Science Association enhances public understanding of policymaking and improves the quality of scholarship, teaching and reporting on American national politics.

Publications 
One key component of APSA's mission is to support political science education and the professional development of its practitioners. The APSA publications program attempts to fill the diverse needs of political scientists in academic settings as well as practitioners working outside of academia, and students at various stages of their education.

Journals
American Political Science Review (APSR)
Journal of Political Science Education
Perspectives on Politics
PS: Political Science & Politics
Organized Section Journals

Presidents of the American Political Science Association 

 Frank J. Goodnow, 1904-1905
 Albert Shaw, 1905-1906
 Frederick N. Judson, 1906-1907
 James Bryce, 1907-1908
 Abbott Lawrence Lowell, 1908-1909
 Woodrow Wilson, 1909-1910
 Simeon E. Baldwin, 1910-1911
 Albert Bushnell Hart, 1911-1912
 Westel W. Willoughby, 1912-1913
 John Bassett Moore, 1913-1914
 Ernst Freund, 1914-1915
 Jesse Macy, 1915-1916
 Munroe Smith, 1916-1917
 Henry Jones Ford, 1917-1918
 Paul Samuel Reinsch, 1918-1919
 Leo S. Rowe, 1919-1920
 William A. Dunning, 1920-1921
 Harry A. Garfield, 1921-1922
 James Wilford Garner, 1923-1924
 Charles E. Merriam, 1924-1923
 Charles A. Beard, 1925-1924
 William Bennett Munro, 1926-1925
 Jesse S. Reeves, 1927-1926
 John A. Fairlie, 1928-1927
 Benjamin F. Shambaugh, 1929-1928
 Edward S. Corwin, 1930-1929
 William F. Willoughby, 1931-1932
 Isidor Loeb, 1932-1933
 Walter J. Shepard, 1933-1934
 Francis W. Coker, 1934-1935
 Arthur N. Holcombe, 1935-1936
 Thomas Reed Powell, 1936-1937
 Clarence A. Dykstra, 1937-1938
 Charles Grove Haines, 1938-1939
 Robert C. Brooks, 1939-1940
 Frederic A. Ogg, 1940-1941
 William Anderson, 1941-1942
 Robert E. Cushman, 1942-1943
 Leonard D. White, 1943-1944
 John Gaus, 1944-1945
 Walter F. Dodd, 1945-1946
 Arthur W. MacMahon, 1946-1947
 Henry R. Spencer, 1947-1948
 Quincy Wright, 1948-1949
 James K. Pollock, 1949-1950
 Peter H. Odegard, 1950-1951
 Luther Gulick, 1951-1952
 E. Pendleton Herring, 1952-1953
 Ralph J. Bunche, 1953-1954
 Charles McKinley, 1954-1955
 Harold D. Lasswell, 1955-1956
 E.E. Schattschneider, 1956-1957
 V.O. Key, Jr., 1957-1958
 R. Taylor Cole, 1958-1959
 Carl B. Swisher, 1959-1960
 Emmette Redford, 1960-1961
 Charles S. Hyneman, 1961-1962
 Carl J. Friedrich, 1962-1963
 C. Herman Pritchett, 1963-1964
 David B. Truman, 1964-1965
 Gabriel A. Almond, 1965-1966
 Robert A. Dahl, 1966-1967
 Merle Fainsod, 1967-1968
 David Easton, 1968-1969
 Karl W. Deutsch, 1969-1970
 Robert E. Lane, 1970-1971
 Heinz Eulau, 1971-1972
 Robert E. Ward, 1972-1973
 Avery Leiserson, 1973-1974
 Austin Ranney, 1974-1975
 James MacGregor Burns, 1975-1976
 Samuel H. Beer, 1976-1977
 John C. Wahlke, 1977-1978
 Leon D. Epstein, 1978-1979
 Warren E. Miller, 1979-1980
 Charles E. Lindblom, 1980-1981
 Seymour Martin Lipset, 1981-1982
 William H. Riker, 1982-1983
 Philip E. Converse, 1983-1984
 Richard F. Fenno, Jr., 1984-1985
 Aaron B. Wildavsky, 1985-1986
 Samuel P. Huntington, 1986-1987
 Kenneth N. Waltz, 1987-1988
 Lucian W. Pye, 1988-1989
 Judith N. Shklar, 1989-1990
 Theodore J. Lowi, 1990-1991
 James Q. Wilson, 1991-1992
 Lucius J. Barker, 1992-1993
 Charles O. Jones, 1993-1994
 Sidney Verba, 1994-1995
 Arend Lijphart, 1995-1996
 Elinor Ostrom, 1996-1997
 M. Kent Jennings, 1997-1998
 Matthew Holden Jr., 1998-1999
 Robert O. Keohane, 1999-2000
 Robert Jervis, 2000-2001
 Robert Putnam, 2001-2002
 Theda Skocpol, 2002-2003
 Susanne Hoeber Rudolph, 2003-2004
 Margaret Levi, 2004-2005
 Ira Katznelson, 2005-2006
 Robert Axelrod, 2006-2007
 Dianne Pinderhughes, 2007-2008
 Peter Katzenstein, 2008-2009
 Henry E. Brady, 2009-2010
 Carole Pateman, 2010-2011
 G. Bingham Powell, 2011-2012
 Jane Mansbridge, 2012-2013
 John Aldrich, 2013-2014
 Rodney E. Hero, 2014-2015
 Jennifer Hochschild, 2015-2016
 David A. Lake, 2016–2017
 Kathleen Thelen, 2017-2018
 Rogers Smith, 2018–2019
 Paula D. McClain 2019–2020
 Janet Box-Steffensmeier, 2020-2021
 John Ishiyama, 2021-22
 Lisa Martin, 2022-23
 Mark Warren

APSA organized sections 
APSA members may also join the 41 membership organized sections focused around research themes in political science.

 1. Federalism and Intergovernmental Relations
 2. Law and Courts
 3. Legislative Studies
 4. Public Policy
 5. Political Organizations and Parties
 6. Public Administration
 7. Conflict Processes
 8. Representation and Electoral Systems
 9. Presidents and Executive Politics
 10. Political Methodology
 11. Religion and Politics
 13. Urban Politics
 15. Science, Technology and Environmental Politics
 16. Women and Politics Research
 17. Foundations of Political Theory
 18. Information Technology and Politics
 19. International Security
 20. Comparative Politics
 21. European Politics and Society
 22. State Politics and Policy
 23. Political Communication
 24. Politics and History
 25. Political Economy
 27. New Political Science
 28. Political Psychology
 29. Political Science Education
 30. Politics, Literature, and Film
 31. Foreign Policy
 32. Elections, Public Opinion, and Voting Behavior
 33. Race, Ethnicity and Politics
 34. International History and Politics
 35. Comparative Democratization
 36. Human Rights
 37. Qualitative and Multi-method Research
 38. Sexuality and Politics
 39. Health Politics and Policy
 40. Canadian Politics
 41. Political Networks
 42. Experimental Research
 43. Migration and Citizenship
 44. African Politics
 45. Class and Inequality
 46. Ideas, Knowledge and Politics
 47. American Political Thought
48. International Collaboration
49. Middle East and North Africa Politics

Presidential rankings
Since 2015, they have conducted two rankings of American Presidents.

2015
In 2015, Republican President Abraham Lincoln was rated the greatest President, while Democratic President James Buchanan was considered the worst. Barack Obama, president at the time of the survey, being ranked 18th.

2018

In 2018, Republican Abraham Lincoln was ranked the greatest American President, while Donald Trump, president at the time of the survey, was ranked last. Previous president Barack Obama was ranked 8th.

Notes

References

External links
 American Political Science Association
 Political Science Now

Professional associations based in the United States
Dupont Circle
Organizations established in 1903
Political science organizations
Political science in the United States
1903 establishments in the United States
Oral history
Non-profit organizations based in Washington, D.C.
501(c)(3) organizations